Superman: Escape from Krypton (originally known as Superman: The Escape) is a steel shuttle roller coaster located at Six Flags Magic Mountain in Valencia, California. These two coasters were the first to utilize Linear Synchronous Motor (LSM) technology to propel vehicles to top speed. To date, it is the only reverse freefall coaster left in existence after the dismantling of Tower of Terror II.

The intended opening date of 1996 was postponed because of several issues with the launch system. The ride was closed in late 2010 for refurbishment, and it emerged in 2011 as "Superman: Escape from Krypton". As of 2013, Superman: Escape from Krypton has the Second-tallest structure, the Fourth-fastest speed and the second-longest drop of any roller coaster in the world.

History

Superman: The Escape (1997–2010)
During early planning, Six Flags Magic Mountain considered building a new roller coaster named Velocetron themed to The Man of Steel comic book series. Ultimately, the name Superman: The Escape was chosen, and the ride was announced on January 5, 1996. It would surpass Desperado and Phantom's Revenge to become the fastest roller coaster in the world and the first to reach .

Superman: The Escape was designed by Swiss manufacturer Intamin, and construction began in late 1995. During the final stages, the last section of track was installed at the ride's highest point on May 3, 1996. Originally, the ride was set to open on June 1, 1996, but it was delayed due to troubles with the launch system. In late 1996, there was a preview for season pass holders. After 10 months of testing and reengineering, the ride opened on March 15, 1997. After its opening, the media claimed Superman to be the fastest roller coaster in the world. Superman therefore lost its claim as being the first roller coaster to reach , although it was then tied with Tower of Terror as the fastest roller coaster in the world. However, the ride became the first roller coaster in the world to go over 400 ft, therefore becoming the tallest roller coaster in the world at the time.

By early 1999, the ride remained closed for maintenance. After new brake fins were installed, one side reopened in late February. On March 22, 1999, Six Flags Magic Mountain announced that Superman: The Escape was fully operating with both sides running.

In June 2004, Superman: The Escape's seat belts were modified because of an incident on the Superman – Ride of Steel roller coaster at Six Flags New England. California State Regulators asked the park to make modifications to the rides' restraint systems to prevent a similar incident in the future.

Just after July 4 weekend of 2010, Superman: The Escape ceased operations with no reason given. A sign posted in front of the ride indicated that it would not reopen until the 2011 season, with hints that there would be improvements made to the ride experience.  After Superman: The Escape's sister ride, the Tower of Terror II at Dreamworld, underwent a major refurbishment in 2010 which entailed a new vehicle which launches backward, speculation turned to the possibility of a similar modification to the Magic Mountain ride. Six Flags Magic Mountain officials quickly denied rumors that it would receive a Bizarro retheming, similar to roller coasters at other Six Flags parks.

Superman: Escape from Krypton (2011–present)
On October 20, 2010, Six Flags Magic Mountain officially announced the refurbishment and re-theming of Superman: The Escape, in addition to the construction of two new roller coasters. As part of the refurbishment, the ride was renamed to Superman: Escape from Krypton and featured new backward launching cars and a new color scheme. The upgraded ride reopened to the public on March 19, 2011.

Superman: Escape from Krypton closed again on February 5, 2012 (almost a year after the refurbishment), to prepare for the new 2012 attraction Lex Luthor: Drop of Doom. Two drop towers, also built by Intamin, were integrated into the existing sides of Superman: Escape from Krypton's structure. The ride reopened when construction was finished on July 7, 2012.

To enable the construction of the Full Throttle roller coaster, Superman: Escape from Krypton was temporarily closed from December 2012. It reopened in mid-January 2013, with Six Flags Magic Mountain stating the ride might have intermittent closures as the construction of Full Throttle continued.

Ride experience

Queue and station

At the entrance to the ride, the Superman "S" shield is imprinted and now painted onto the ground. The entrance area and queue are modeled after the Fortress of Solitude, Superman's headquarters. The queue line winds through the building and forks, giving guests the option to wait in line for either the left or right side. During slow days and in the off-season, there may be only one side operating. The fork is followed by a long tunnel down each side of the fortress, which is often kept cold from the air-conditioning. Guests then head into the waiting area, where they are separated into four rows and board after the doors open. The station is lit green, modeled as Krypton, the planet that is full of Kryptonite rock that can take away Superman's powers. Inside is a crystalline-looking environment which recreates Superman's fortress in the Arctic. If the Velocetron name had been chosen, the queue and station would have had ancient ruins and a giant laser. A page on display in the SBNO (Standing but not operating) Sky Tower, the park's observation tower, shows the concept art for Velocetron.

Layout
The roller coaster has two parallel tracks, which are identical. Riders experience a g-force of 4.5 during the launch. The vehicle then climbs up  at a 90 degree angle. Riders climb this vertical section facing directly downward, before slightly stopping near the top of the tower. During the vertical section of the ride, riders experience weightlessness for about 6.5 seconds. The vehicle drops  and is slowed down before re-entering the station.

Vehicles
The roller coaster originally featured two vehicles, each with three rows of four seats and one row of two seats for a total of 14 riders per vehicle. Both vehicles were built to only launch forward. After the ride was refurbished in 2010, new "streamlined" vehicles with the Superman logo were introduced. The new vehicles were designed with low-profile sides to enhance the open-air feeling. Although they are wider, the row of the three seats in the older vehicle was reduced to two, lowering the total number of riders to 14. Both of the new trains were configured to launch backward, although they were designed to launch forward as well. In late August 2021, the left side vehicle of Superman was once again placed forward, allowing riders to choose if they want to experience a forward or backward launch. This is the first time riders can choose between two different ride experiences.

Track
The tower is in an "L" shape with two parallel tracks. When the ride opened, the entire structure was painted white. After the ride was refurbished, the top third of the structure was painted red, the track was painted yellow and the rest was painted blue.

Records
For the first four years of operation, Superman: Escape from Krypton was tied with Tower of Terror II as the fastest roller coaster in the world. Superman: Escape from Krypton held the record for the tallest roller coaster in the world until 2003 when the record was taken by the defunct  Top Thrill Dragster at Cedar Point. As of 2020, it has the fourth fastest speed, the second tallest structure and the third-highest drop in the world.

References

External links

Superman: Escape from Krypton official website 
 
Superman: Escape from Krypton Photos and Review at Ultimate Rollercoaster.com
Superman: Escape from Krypton Information

Roller coasters in California
Escape from Krypton
Roller coasters introduced in 1997
Roller coasters operated by Six Flags
Six Flags Magic Mountain
Warner Bros. Global Brands and Experiences attractions